Wildspace is an adventure module published in 1990 for the Advanced Dungeons & Dragons fantasy role-playing game.

Plot summary
Wildspace is a Spelljammer adventure scenario and an introduction to campaigning in space, in which the player characters board a ship from the skies and are taken into space where they fight a monster that wants to eat their world.

Publication history
SJA1 Wildspace was written by Allen Varney, with a cover by Brom, and was published by TSR in 1990 as a 64-page booklet with a large color map and an outer folder.

Reception

Reviews

References

Dungeons & Dragons modules
Role-playing game supplements introduced in 1990
Spelljammer